The Wog Boy 2: Kings of Mykonos is a 2010 Australian comedy film directed by Peter Andrikidis, starring Nick Giannopoulos, Vince Colosimo and Costas Kilias. It is the second part of "The Blue Valiant Trilogy" (aka Wog Boys Trilogy), being the sequel to the 2000 film The Wog Boy, and preceding the final installment in the series, Wog Boys Forever.  It was released in Australia on 20 May 2010 and UK on 7 January 2011. The film received negative reviews.

Plot
The film starts off with the funeral of a man named Panos. A very rich and handsome young man called Mihalis thinks he inherits all Panos' possessions but Panos has left all his estate to someone else. Soon after the funeral, cousin Tzimis rings Steve Karamitsis to announce he has inherited a beach worth 2.5 million euros, a tavern and a small house on the Greek resort island of Mykonos from his uncle Panos that he had never met. Steve watches his friend Tony the Yugoslav as he gets arrested in his father's shop for theft and drugs, losing the shop and his Beloved '69 Valiant Pacer. Steve and his old friend Frank who has lost his wife and his mistress fly together to Mykonos. Cousin Tzimis picks up the two friends from the airport and brings Steve up to speed with local customs and habits. Tzimis and his Spartan wife Voula are managing the tavern Steve has inherited. Steve finds out that to get his inheritance, he must pay 1.1 million euros in tax because he is not an immediate descendant of Panos. Steve does not have that much money. The two friends settle in Panos' home and discover Panos' old car, a rare 1964 Pontiac Catalina and a Kri kri goat called Apollo.

Later Tony shows up, having managed to escape from the Australian authorities and calling himself Tony the Cretan, thinking that Crete is not a part of Greece. Two German environmentalists, Otto and Dieter, are after the goat Apollo claiming it is a rare species. Steve falls for Zoe, a beautiful down-to-earth singer who owns half of a local night club called "the Seven Sins". The other half is owned by Mihalis who is engaged to Zoe. Frank gets into a nasty bet with Pierluigi (Kevin Sorbo), who is called the King of Mykonos because he had sex with 43 women in one month, "a record that will never be broken" as Tzimis says. The bet is to seduce Enza (Cosima Coppola), a strikingly beautiful but distant and snob Italian girl.

As the story progresses, it is revealed that no one is who it seems to be. Pierluigi is not Italian but an American and has a secret agenda, Mihalis has ulterior motive for taking over the beach, Steve is not as 'wog' as he thinks he is, Frank is not as successful with women, Zoe has a tragic past and is blackmailed by Mihalis, Enza is not snob after all and Panos was actually Steve's biological father. Steve fails to find hard evidence to prove Panos is his father. Mihalis steps in and claims the inheritance for himself, declaring that he can pay up for taxes. He intends to sell the beach. Steve then enters a rally competition with Mihalis trying to take the inheritance. Tony gets the parts needed for Steve to repair the Pontiac and race against Mihalis' Porsche 997. The two Germans interrupt the rally and reveal that they have discovered an ancient coin of great archaeological significance at Steve's beach, but Apollo swallowed it. If the coin is retrieved and delivered to the authorities, the beach becomes an archaeological site and cannot be exploited or sold. Mihalis and Steve abandon the race, search for and fight over the coin. At the last moment, Zoe steps in and delivers documents proving Panos was Steve's biological father. Steve gets the inheritance and gives up the beach to become a historical site named "Apollo" after the goat, Zoe is finally free from Mihalis' grasp and the film ends with the people of the island singing "Down Under" by Men at Work.

Cast
Nick Giannopoulos as Steve Karamitsis
Vince Colosimo as Frank
Zeta Makrypoulia as Zoe
Costas Kilias as Tony the Yugoslav (or Tony the Cretan)
Alex Dimitriades as Mihalis
Kevin Sorbo as Pierluigi
Cosima Coppola as Enza 
Dimitris Starovas as Tzimis
Galini Tseva as Voula
Xander Allanous as Stavros
Tony Nikolakopoulos as Theo
Thomas Heyne as Otto
Mario Hertel as Dieter

Reception
The film has received generally negative reviews. Review aggregate Rotten Tomatoes reports that 22% of critics have given the film a positive review based on 9 reviews, with an average score of 4.8/10.

On At the Movies film critics Margaret Pomeranz and David Stratton both gave the film a negative review, awarding it 2.5 and 2 stars out of five respectively. 'The movie is a more accurate representation of Wogs in Australia.'

Shaun Micallef has used the movie as somewhat a running gag on the quiz show Talkin' 'Bout Your Generation

Sequel
In June 2021, a third film Wog Boy 3: Wog Boys Forever started production in Melbourne, and was released on October 10, 2022.

See also
Cinema of Australia
Cinema of Greece

References

External links

2010 films
English-language Greek films
Australian comedy films
Films set in Melbourne
Films set in Greece
Films shot in Melbourne
Films shot in Greece
2010 comedy films
2010s English-language films